The Division II was a sailing event on the Sailing at the 1988 Summer Olympics program in Pusan, South Korea. Seven races were scheduled. 45 sailors, on 45 boats, from 45 nations competed.

Results 

DNF = Did Not Finish, DSQ = Disqualified, PMS = Premature Start
Crossed out results did not count for the total result.
 = Male,  = Female

Daily standings

Notes

References 
 
 
 

Division II
Division II (windsurf board)
Men's events at the 1988 Summer Olympics